Jeff Rezabek (born March 27, 1969) is the former Representative of the 43rd district of the Ohio House of Representatives. Rezabek is an attorney who originally is from Grand Island, New York. He relocated to Dayton to attend law school at the University of Dayton.  In 2014, Rezabek decided to challenge incumbent Representative Roland Winburn for a seat in the Ohio House of Representatives. While Winburn originally held a safely Democratic district, redistricting made him vulnerable, and Rezabek was able to defeat him 58% to 42%. He was the first Republican to represent the district in forty years.

References

Links
Official campaign site

Republican Party members of the Ohio House of Representatives
1969 births
Living people
People from Grand Island, New York
People from Clayton, Ohio
University of Dayton alumni
21st-century American politicians